Congenital diaphragmatic hernia (CDH) is a birth defect of the diaphragm.  The most common type of CDH is a Bochdalek hernia;  other types include Morgagni hernia, diaphragm eventration and central tendon defects of the diaphragm.  Malformation of the diaphragm allows the abdominal organs to push into the chest cavity, hindering proper lung formation.

CDH is a life-threatening pathology in infants and a major cause of death due to two complications: pulmonary hypoplasia and pulmonary hypertension.  Experts disagree on the relative importance of these two conditions, with some focusing on hypoplasia, others on hypertension.  Newborns with CDH often have severe respiratory distress which can be life-threatening unless treated appropriately.

Classification

Bochdalek hernia

The Bochdalek hernia, also known as a postero-lateral diaphragmatic hernia, is the most common manifestation of CDH, accounting for more than 95% of cases. In this instance the diaphragm abnormality is characterized by a hole in the postero-lateral corner of the diaphragm which allows passage of the abdominal viscera into the chest cavity.  The majority of Bochdalek hernias (80–85%) occur on the left side of the diaphragm, a large proportion of the remaining cases occur on the right side. To date, it carries a high mortality and is an active area of clinical research.

Morgagni hernia

This rare anterior defect of the diaphragm is variably referred to as a Morgagni, retrosternal, or parasternal hernia. Accounting for approximately 2% of all CDH cases, it is characterized by herniation through the foramina of Morgagni which are located immediately adjacent and posterior to the xiphoid process of the sternum.

Diaphragm eventration
The diagnosis of congenital diaphragmatic eventration is used when there is abnormal displacement (i.e. elevation) of part or all of an otherwise intact diaphragm into the chest cavity. This rare type of CDH occurs because in the region of eventration the diaphragm is thinner, allowing the abdominal viscera to protrude upwards.

Pathophysiology
There are genetic causes of CDH including aneuploidies, chromosome copy number variants, and single gene mutations. Research implicates a few gene mutations including LONP1 and MYRF. It involves three major defects:
 A failure of the diaphragm to completely close during development
 Herniation of the abdominal contents into the chest
 Pulmonary hypoplasia

Diagnosis

This condition can often be diagnosed before birth and fetal intervention can sometimes help, depending on the severity of the condition.
Infants born with diaphragmatic hernia experience respiratory failure due to both pulmonary hypertension and pulmonary hypoplasia. The first condition is a restriction of blood flow through the lungs thought to be caused by defects in the lung. Pulmonary hypoplasia or decreased lung volume is directly related to the abdominal organs presence in the chest cavity which causes the lungs to be severely undersized, especially on the side of the hernia.

Survival rates for infants with this condition vary, but have generally been increasing through advances in neonatal medicine. Work has been done to correlate survival rates to ultrasound measurements of the lung volume as compared to the baby's head circumference. This figure known as the lung-to-head ratio (LHR). Still, LHR remains an inconsistent measure of survival. Outcomes of CDH are largely dependent on the severity of the defect and the appropriate timing of treatment.

A small percentage of cases go unrecognized into adulthood.

Treatment
The first step in management is orogastric tube placement and securing the airway (intubation). Ideally, the baby will never take a breath, to avoid air going into the intestines and compressing the lungs and heart. The baby will then be immediately placed on a ventilator.
Extracorporeal membrane oxygenation (ECMO) has been used as part of the treatment strategy at some hospitals. ECMO acts as a heart-lung bypass.

Diaphragm eventration is typically repaired thoracoscopically, by a technique called plication of the diaphragm. Plication basically involves a folding of the eventrated diaphragm which is then sutured in order to “take up the slack” of the excess diaphragm tissue.

Prognosis
Congenital diaphragmatic hernia has a mortality rate of 40–62%, with outcomes being more favorable in the absence of other congenital abnormalities.  Individual rates vary greatly dependent upon multiple factors: size of hernia, organs involved, additional birth defects and/or genetic problems, amount of lung growth, age and size at birth, type of treatments, timing of treatments, complications (such as infections) and lack of lung function.

See also
 Diaphragmatic rupture

References

External links 

 Congenital Diaphragmatic Hernia Study Group under University of Texas Health Science Center at Houston
 DHREAMS (Diaphragmatic Hernia Research & Exploration; Advancing Molecular Science) Project  coordinated at Columbia University Medical Center
 CDH International – A global initiative to stop Congenital Diaphragmatic Hernia

Congenital disorders of musculoskeletal system
Diaphragmatic hernias